Steven L. Falck (born April 26, 1958) is an American politician in the state of Iowa.

Falck was born in Manchester, Iowa and attended Upper Iowa University. A Democrat, he served in the Iowa House of Representatives from 1997 to 2002 (28th district).

References

1958 births
Living people
People from Delaware County, Iowa
Upper Iowa University alumni
Businesspeople from Iowa
Democratic Party members of the Iowa House of Representatives
20th-century American politicians
21st-century American politicians